Lahugala Kiri Vehera or Kiri Vehera Viharaya is an ancient Buddhist temple situated in Lahugala, Ampara District, Sri Lanka. The temple is located in Perani Lahugala Grama Niladari division of Lahugala DS. It is believed that this temple is belonged to the reign of king Dappula I (661-664). The temple has been formally recognised by the Government as an archaeological site in Sri Lanka. The designation was declared on 10 October 2014 under the government Gazette number 1884.

References

Notes

External links
Lahugala Kirivehera Viharaya Archaeological Site – ලාහුගල කිරිවෙහෙර විහාරය පුරාවිද්‍යා භූමිය

Buddhist temples in Ampara District
Stupas in Sri Lanka
Archaeological protected monuments in Ampara District